The 2006–07 season was Manchester City Football Club's fifth consecutive season playing in the FA Premier League, the top division of English football, and its tenth season since the Premier League was first created with Manchester City as one of its original 22 founding member clubs.  Overall, it was the team's 115th season playing in a division of English football, most of which have been spent in the top flight.

Season review 
The 2006–07 season proved tough for club which skirmished with relegation from the Premier League and ended up finishing in 14th position. The club were again eliminated from the League Cup by a League One team, this time by Chesterfield early on in the season. Ben Thatcher's elbow challenge on Pedro Mendes whilst playing Portsmouth shocked many – a challenge which prompted City to take unprecedented action and banned Thatcher for six matches by the club and a six weeks fine. Pearce called the challenge "indefensible" and the Football Association banned Thatcher for a further eight matches. The side also scored just ten goals at home in the league, and none after New Years Day in 2007, a record low in top-flight English football.

In December 2006, the club issued a statement regarding a possible takeover, and on 21 June, the Manchester City board accepted an £81.6 million offer for the club from Thaksin Shinawatra. One of his first moves was to schedule a press conference to announce former-England manager Sven-Göran Eriksson as his new manager – Eriksson's first job since leaving international duty.

Team kit 
For this season, the shirt sponsor for all of the club's kits continued to be the previous season's sponsor, Thomas Cook, while the team kits were produced by the previous season's supplier, Reebok.

Historical league performance 
Prior to this season, the history of Manchester City's performance in the English football league hierarchy since the creation of the Premier League in 1992 is summarised by the following timeline chart – which commences with the last season (1991–92) of the old Football League First Division (from which the Premier League was formed).

Friendly games 
This season not all of the team's friendly games were played during the preparatory run-in to the official start of the new league campaign, with a couple of friendly games taking place during the course of the active season.  The first of these games was perhaps just a "belated pre-season friendly" that was played with the season still only nine days old, while the other one against Blackpool in February was more of a mutually arranged scrimmage behind closed doors, with one of its intended purposes being to provide a "friendly competitive" tryout for the 28-year-old Belgian international striker, Émile Mpenza, who at the time the Manchester club was considering signing.  This impromptu scrimmage served as a key part of Mpenza's brief trial with City and saw him perform well enough, with his scoring of the second goal in the 3–0 win, that he was subsequently signed by City two days later (his unattached free agent status permitting him to be signed outside of the January transfer window).  The extemporaneous Valentine's Day friendly also gave some City players in need of match fitness, such as Didi Hamann and Stephen Jordan, a chance to get a full 90 minutes of play under their belts.

Pre-season

Thomas Cook Trophy

Mid-season

Competitive games

Premier League

Position in final standings

Results summary

Points breakdown 

Points at home: 21 
Points away from home: 21 

Points against "Big Four" teams: 4 
Points against promoted teams: 6

6 points: Fulham, Middlesbrough, West Ham United
4 points: Everton, Newcastle United, Sheffield United
3 points: Arsenal, Aston Villa
2 points: Watford
1 point: Bolton Wanderers, Charlton Athletic, Liverpool, Portsmouth
0 points: Blackburn Rovers, Chelsea, Manchester United, Reading,
Tottenham Hotspur, Wigan Athletic

Biggest & smallest 
Biggest home wins: 3–1 vs. Fulham, 18 November 2006 
2–0 vs. West Ham United, 23 September 2006 
Biggest home defeat: 0–3 vs. Blackburn Rovers, 20 January 2007 
Biggest away wins: 1–3 vs. Aston Villa, 29 November 2006  & vs. Fulham, 9 April 2007 
 0–2 vs. Middlesbrough, 17 March 2007 
Biggest away defeat: 4–0 vs. Wigan Athletic, 21 October 2006 

Biggest home attendance: 47,244 vs. Manchester United, 5 May 2007 
Smallest home attendance: 35,776 vs. Fulham, 18 November 2006 
Biggest away attendance: 75,858 vs. Manchester United, 9 December 2006 
Smallest away attendance: 16,235 vs. Wigan Athletic, 21 October 2006

Results by round

Individual match reports

League Cup

FA Cup

First-team squad

Left club during season

Reserve squad

Statistics

Appearances and goals

|-
! colspan=14 style=background:#dcdcdc; text-align:center| Goalkeepers

|-
! colspan=14 style=background:#dcdcdc; text-align:center| Defenders

|-
! colspan=14 style=background:#dcdcdc; text-align:center| Midfielders

|-
! colspan=14 style=background:#dcdcdc; text-align:center| Forwards

|-
! colspan=14 style=background:#dcdcdc; text-align:center| Players transferred out during the season

|-

Goal scorers

All competitions

Premier League

League Cup

FA Cup 

Information current as of 13 May 2007 (end of season)

Transfers and loans

Transfers in

Transfers out

Loans in

Loans out

References 

Manchester City F.C. seasons
Manchester City
Articles which contain graphical timelines